Tătărăni is a commune in Vaslui County, Western Moldavia, Romania. It is composed of nine villages: Bǎlțați, Crǎsnǎșeni, Giurgești, Leoști, Manțu, Stroiești, Tătărăni, Valea lui Bosie and Valea Seacă.

References

Communes in Vaslui County
Localities in Western Moldavia